Alie is a given name. Notable people with the name include:

 Alie Badara Mansaray, Sierra Leonean government administrator
 Alie Boorsma (born 1959), Dutch speed skater
 Alie Israel (born 1983), American track runner
 Alie Lindberg (1849-1933), Finnish pianist
 Alie te Riet (born 1953), Dutch breaststroke swimmer
 Alie Sesay (born 1993), English-Sierra Leonean footballer
 Alie Stijl (1923-1999), Dutch swimmer
 Alie Ward (born 1976), American writer